James Ivan McGuire (24 July 1903 – 1989) was an Irish politician and barrister. He was elected to Dáil Éireann as a Cumann na nGaedheal Teachta Dála (TD) for the Dublin South constituency at the 1933 general election. He lost his seat at the 1937 general election.

References

1903 births
1989 deaths
Cumann na nGaedheal TDs
Fine Gael TDs
Members of the 8th Dáil
Irish barristers
Politicians from County Dublin
20th-century Irish lawyers